Hidden Lake is located in Glacier National Park, in the U. S. state of Montana.

Hidden Lake is surrounded by numerous peaks, including Bearhat Mountain to the southwest, Dragons Tail to the south, Clements Mountain to the north, and Reynolds Mountain to the east. Hidden Lake is a popular day hike destination, with the Hidden Lake overlook a  hike from Logan Pass, and the lakeshore adding another  one way.

See also
List of lakes in Flathead County, Montana (A-L)

References

Lakes of Glacier National Park (U.S.)
Lakes of Flathead County, Montana
Going-to-the-Sun Road